Brandon Quincy Adams (born July 31, 1989) is an American professional boxer who challenged for the WBC middleweight title in 2019. He was the winner of season 5 of The Contender series.

Early life 
Adams was born on July 31, 1989, between Compton and Watts in Los Angeles, California.  He fought against involvement with gangs and drugs early on in life, surviving through what he calls "faith and a courageous sense of humor." Eager to participate in sports as a youth, but shunned for his family's troubled reputation in the streets of Compton and Watts, Adams found a way around the hardships of the neighborhood by using the discipline of boxing as a way to better his opportunities in life and to defend himself. "I saw my older brothers get shot, lost best friends within 100 feet from where I lie my head," Adams explained. "I had to defend myself from being bullied because fighting was a reality of the streets. Being very small for my age, certainly the smallest of all my friends, I naturally had more to prove."

Quickly gaining a reputation after winning several backyard brawls, Brandon's neighbor "Big Al" took notice and brought him into the professional and legalized world of boxing. Introducing him into the "last old school boxing gym" in South Central Los Angeles, Big Al became Brandon's mentor and first trainer. "My neighbor Big Al saw my enthusiasm to box and make it out of the backyard, so he began taking me to the gym," Adams explained of his mentor. "Al introduced me to everyone in the gym, he had me do strength and conditioning in the same sessions as my training. He was a male figure that stepped in to try to mentor and help me, and I’m forever grateful."

Career 
In the same gym, Brandon eventually developed into a world class boxer under the tutelage of Hall of Fame trainer Dub Huntley, a trainer portrayed in the film Million Dollar Baby. "Dub would say I need to turn pro ASAP. I started training at 19, my first amateur fight was at 20, My first professional fight at 21. A feat nearly unheard of in the boxing industry. I was moving really fast because they believed in me," Adams said. "I went pro inside of two years, which is very unusual. Dub had multiple world champions and when he saw me train, he said I was ready to turn pro, he told me I would be a world champion."

After years of victories, Adams earned his nickname "The Cannon," dominating several local showcases and accumulating an undefeated record in fights across the U.S. and Mexico. Gaining the attention of the boxing community, Adams was requested for training camps by boxing contenders Shawn Porter, Gennady Golovkin and Antonio Margarito. In 2013, he signed with Banner Promotions and in 2015, he participated in ESPN's nationally televised annual Boxcino Tournament.

He ultimately finished runner-up in the tournament after a false blood doping accusation severely affected his training regiment, his ability to meet the required weight class, and his energy during the fight. A defeated fighter had falsely accused him of taking performance enhancers, which required Adams to be cleared by the Boxing Commission. After their independent blood tests cleared him to fight, he only had two days to lose twelve pounds. He accomplished this through the usage of sweat creams, sauna suits, and running. The extreme measures depleted his strength and caused him to lose the second round.

Relegating to full recovery mode over the next few years, in 2018 Brandon was invited to join season 5 of the EPIX network television show The Contender. The show revived his career, leading to his victory over Shane Mosley Jr. for the show finale and championship. Unfortunately, Big Al died from a heart attack during this time. Although severely affected by Big Al's death, Adams fought on 29 June 2019 against Jermall Charlo in Houston, Texas. Airing on Showtime with big box office appeal, the fight marked Brandon's national debut with over one million expected viewers. Charlo won the fight on points, retaining the WBC middleweight title.

Professional boxing record

References

External links

1989 births
Living people
American male boxers
Middleweight boxers